Royal Challengers Bangalore (RCB) is a franchise cricket team based in Bangalore, India, which plays in the Indian Premier League (IPL). They were one of the eight teams that competed in the 2015 Indian Premier League. They were captained by Virat Kohli. Royal Challengers Bangalore finished third in the IPL.

Squad
 Players with international caps are listed in bold.

Indian Premier League season

Standings
Royal Challengers Bangalore finished third in the league stage of IPL 2015.

Match log

References

2015 Indian Premier League
Royal Challengers Bangalore seasons
2010s in Bangalore